is a railway station located in Adachi, Tokyo, Japan.

Lines 

Tokyo Metropolitan Bureau of Transportation
Nippori-Toneri Liner

Station Layout
This elevated station consists of a single island platform serving two tracks.

History 
The station opened on 30 March, 2008, when the Nippori-Toneri Liner began operation.

Station numbering was introduced in November 2017, with the station receiving station number NT05.

References

External links
Toei Adachi-Odai Station 

Railway stations in Tokyo
Railway stations in Japan opened in 2008
Nippori-Toneri Liner